Katja Schroffenegger (born 28 April 1991) is an Italian professional footballer who plays as a goalkeeper for Serie A club Fiorentina and the Italy women's national team.

Club career
She previously played for FC Südtirol in Serie A. On 19 June 2013, she signed with Bayern Munich.

International career
In April 2011 she made her debut for the Italian national team. She is currently the national team's fourth choice goalkeeper.

References

External links
 

1991 births
Living people
Italian women's footballers
Italy women's international footballers
Italian expatriate sportspeople in Germany
Expatriate women's footballers in Germany
Sportspeople from Bolzano
Germanophone Italian people
FF USV Jena players
FC Bayern Munich (women) players
Bayer 04 Leverkusen (women) players
Inter Milan (women) players
Women's association football goalkeepers
Fiorentina Women's F.C. players
Frauen-Bundesliga players
Serie A (women's football) players
Florentia San Gimignano S.S.D. players
Footballers from Trentino-Alto Adige/Südtirol
UEFA Women's Euro 2022 players
20th-century Italian women
21st-century Italian women
UEFA Women's Euro 2017 players